"8th World Wonder" is the debut single of American Idol finalist Kimberley Locke from her first studio album, One Love (2004). The single, written by Joel Parkes, Shaun Shankel, and Kyle Jacobs, debuted on the US Billboard Singles Sales Chart at number one, making it the first non-Idol single to top the chart from any Idol finalist. The single was later nominated in the category for "Best Love Song" at the 2004 Teen Choice Awards. The release also features a brand new modern arrangement of Locke's signature song from the show, "Somewhere Over the Rainbow".

"8th World Wonder" is one of the longest-running Idol singles to chart on the Billboard Hot 100, spending 20 weeks on the chart and peaking at number 49. It was Locke's only single to chart on the Hot 100. Outside the United States, the song charted only in the United Kingdom, also reaching number 49. In a recent Entertainment Weekly magazine, "8th World Wonder" was listed as one of the top five songs to come out of American Idol.

Music video
The video for "8th World Wonder" was directed by Sam Erickson. Kimberley Locke stars in the video along with Charles Divins from the soap opera Passions. The video starts with Locke awakening one morning to find a note left by her boyfriend. It then shows each day backwards from current day to 7 days ago when they first made eye contact at a party. The video ends with Locke giving Divins her number at the party they met at. A dance remix version of the video was also released.

Track listings
US CD single
 "8th World Wonder" – 3:59
 "Somewhere Over the Rainbow" – 3:49

UK CD single
 "8th World Wonder" – 3:59
 "8th World Wonder" (Elektrik Kompany radio edit) – 3:30
 "8th World Wonder" (Hi-Bias radio edit) – 3:35
 "8th World Wonder" (video) – 3:59

Charts

Weekly charts

Year-end charts

Release history

Cover versions
Mexican singer Alessandra Rosaldo recorded a Spanish version of "8th World Wonder" entitled "La Octava Maravilla" which was featured on her 2009 album, Alessandra.

References

External links
 "8th World Wonder" Hi-Bias Remix music video
 "La Octava Maravilla", Alessandra Rosaldo

2004 debut singles
2004 songs
Curb Records singles
Kimberley Locke songs
London Records singles
Songs written by Kyle Jacobs (songwriter)